Bridge Ward is a ward in the South West Area of Ipswich, Suffolk, England. It returns three councillors to Ipswich Borough Council.

It is designated Middle Layer Super Output Area Ipswich 012 by the Office of National Statistics. It is composed of 6 Lower Layer Super Output Areas.

Ward profile, 2008
Bridge Ward is located to the south of central Ipswich. In 2005 it had a population of about 7,500. A high proportion of its residents live alone.

Councillors
The following councillors were elected since the boundaries were changed in 2002. Names in brackets indicates that the councillor remained in office without re-election.

References

Wards of Ipswich